Extreme Rock Climbing is part of the Extreme Sports series by Creative Carnage and Head Games. It was released for Microsoft Windows on November 1, 1999. Although the game received poor reviews, it is considered decent in comparison to the other games in the Extreme Sports series, especially Extreme Paintbrawl. The game sold poorly and is now difficult to find for sale. The objective of the game is to climb various rock walls.

Gameplay 
In Extreme Rock Climbing, the player may choose from one of several different game modes, including Free Climb, Capture, Solo Climb, and a practice mode. After that, they can choose from one of many different characters to play as. Then, the player chooses a map, and the game begins. The game is played by using the arrow keys to grab onto one of the rocks on the wall. As the game progresses, the character's health goes down slowly. If it depletes entirely, the player will fall off the rock and lose the game. Power-ups called Power Bars are required to win the game, since they restore the player's health. Once the player reaches the top of the wall, the game rewards them with a congratulations screen and returns to the title menu.

Criticism 
Although it was by no means a good game, IGN gave Extreme Rock Climbing a 4.5/10, which is much higher than most of the other Extreme games. For example, IGN gave Extreme Paintbrawl a 0.7/10. Allgame.com also reviewed the game, and gave it a poor score of 2.5/5. The game was praised by many reviewers for its impressive visuals, and is better than other Extreme games, but it is nonetheless a poor game.

References 
IGN: Extreme Rock Climbing Review
AllGame: Extreme Rock Climbing Review

1999 video games
Extreme sports video games
Activision games
Single-player video games
Windows games
Windows-only games
Video games developed in the United States